Guillermo Hormazábal (born 5 February 1985) is a former Chilean professional tennis player. In 2001, he became an under 16's world champion.

ATP Challenger & ITF Futures

Singles titles (15)

Singles runner-up (10)

References

External links
 
 

Chilean male tennis players
Chilean people of Basque descent
People from Talca
Living people
1985 births
Pan American Games competitors for Chile
Tennis players at the 2007 Pan American Games